Susan Oyama (born May 22, 1943) is a psychologist and philosopher of science, currently professor emerita at the John Jay College and CUNY Graduate Center in New York City.

Oyama's work interrogates the nature versus nurture debates, and problematizes the conceptual foundations (e.g., assumptions, binaries, and classifications) on which these debates depend. Her notion of a "developmental system" allows us to reevaluate and reintegrate standard dichotomies such as development and evolution, body and mind, and stasis and change. Oyama's Developmental systems theory has had a significant impact in cognitive science, psychology, and the philosophy of biology.

Publications
The Ontogeny of Information (2000)
Cycles of Contingency (2001)
Evolution's Eye: A Systems View of the Biology-Culture Divide (2000)
The Ontogeny of Information: Developmental Systems and Evolution is regarded as a foundational text in developmental systems theory

See also
Epigenetics
Evo-devo
Modern evolutionary synthesis

References

21st-century American psychologists
American women psychologists
American women philosophers
Philosophers of science
Philosophers of biology
Living people
Graduate Center, CUNY faculty
John Jay College of Criminal Justice faculty
21st-century American philosophers
20th-century American philosophers
American women biologists
1943 births
20th-century American women
21st-century American women
20th-century American psychologists